Fritz Hofmann is the name of:

Fritz Hofmann (chemist) (1866–1956), German chemist
Fritz Hofmann (athlete) (1871–1927), German athlete
Fritz Hofmann (politician) (1924–2005), Swiss politician

See also 
 Fritz Hoffmann, founder of Hoffmann-La Roche